Nikita Sergeyevich Bakalyuk (born 3 April 2001) is a Russian football player. He plays for FC Arsenal Tula on loan from FC Spartak Moscow.

Club career
He made his debut in the Russian Football National League for FC Spartak-2 Moscow on 23 September 2018 in a game against FC SKA-Khabarovsk.

He made his Russian Premier League debut for FC Spartak Moscow on 15 July 2020 in a game against FC Akhmat Grozny, replacing Alex Král in the 89th minute.

On 21 June 2022, Bakalyuk was loaned to FC Arsenal Tula.

References

External links
 
 
 
 Profile by Russian Football National League

2001 births
People from Ivanteyevka
Sportspeople from Moscow Oblast
Living people
Russian footballers
Association football midfielders
Russia youth international footballers
FC Spartak-2 Moscow players
FC Spartak Moscow players
FC Arsenal Tula players
Russian Premier League players
Russian First League players